Daggett is a former settlement in Carroll County, Illinois, United States. Daggett was located in Salem Township, south of Mount Carroll along Illinois Route 78.

References

Geography of Carroll County, Illinois
Ghost towns in Illinois